The Little Yenisey ( Maly Yenisey) a river in northern Mongolia and in Tuva, Russia. At its confluence with the Great Yenisey in Kyzyl (Tuva), the Yenisey is formed. It rises in the Darkhad Valley in northwestern Khövsgöl aimag, Mongolia under the name Shishged Gol. Within Tuva it is called Kızıl-Xem ('red river') and then Kaa-Xem ('little river') or Maly Yenisey. 

In the Darkhad Valley, it receives its tributaries Sharga and Tengis. It flows westward through the Ulaan Taiga Mountain range to Russia. There it is joined by the Busiyn-Gol, the Belin and the Balyktyg-Khem. Of its 563 km length, 298 are in Mongolia. A bridge has been erected near Renchinlkhümbe sum center.

References

See also

List of rivers of Mongolia
List of rivers of Russia

Khövsgöl Province
International rivers of Asia
Rivers of Mongolia
Rivers of Tuva
Rivers of Kyzyl